Bell High School is a public high school in Bell, California, United States. The school, which serves grades 9 through 12, is a part of District 6 of the Los Angeles Unified School District. Bell High’s motto is "Honor lies in honest toil", its mascot is the eagle, and the school colors are purple and gold. They are rivals with the Huntington Park Spartans.

The school serves several municipalities. The school serves the cities of Bell, Cudahy, and Maywood, and it serves portions of Huntington Park and portions of Vernon. Some portions of Huntington Park and Maywood are jointly zoned to both Bell High School and Huntington Park High School.

History
Bell High School began as the Bell Unit of the Huntington Park Union High School, and opened with two classes, freshmen and sophomores.  There were 14 teachers and 325 students.  Mr. Claude L. Reeves, a graduate from USC, was the first principal of Bell High School and he remained until 1939.

It was in the Los Angeles City High School District until 1961, when it merged into LAUSD.

Located in the Southeastern section of Los Angeles County, Bell High School is a comprehensive high school (grades 9-12) serving 5,375 (2006–2007) students from the tri-communities of Bell, Cudahy, and Maywood.  One of six high schools in Local District 6, and one of forty-nine comprehensive high schools in the Los Angeles Unified School District, Bell High School opened its doors in 1925 for 800 students.

In 2005, South East High School in South Gate opened, relieving Bell. In 2006, Maywood Academy High School opened.

Sports
-Bell High School usually competes with neighboring schools Huntington Park, South Gate, Southeast, Jordan, James A. Garfield and Roosevelt High School. Bell's basketball team has won four 3-A city championships in Bell's 85 years of existence, with major help from Ernie Rojas the first coming in 1997 and the second in 2007 and in 2012 and most recently 2021,Bell's wrestling team has won five C.I.F. city championships, in 1993, 1994, 1996 2005, and 2018.

 Football
 Soccer
 Basketball
 Baseball
 Tennis
 Wrestling
 Volleyball
 United States Academic Decathlon
 Softball
 Cross-Country
 Track & Field
 Cheerleading
 Marching band
 Short Flags
 Color Guard
 Swimming

Activities

The Bell High Marching Eagles consists of the Marching Band, Color Guard, Short Flags and Shields groups at Bell High School. They are known as "The Pride of the Southeast" of the southeast Los Angeles Area.

Notable alumni

 Tom Araya, singer/Bassist, Slayer
 B-Real, rapper, Cypress Hill
 Marvin Benard, athlete, MLB
 Tony Campos, bassist, "Static-X"
 John Ferraro , U.S. politician 
George Gascón, U.S. politician, prosecutor, policeman
 Mike Henry, NFL Linebacker, Actor (M*A*S*H)
 Anwar Jibawi, Actor/YouTuber
 Stan Kenton, jazz Musician
 Mellow Man Ace, rapper
Ruben Quesada, writer and community organizer
 Larry Ramos, The New Christy Minstrels & The Association, singer/musician
 Miguel "Meegs" Rascon, guitarist, "Coal Chamber"
 Ed "Big Daddy" Roth, cartoonist and hot-rod icon
 Sen Dog, rapper, Cypress Hill
 Dennis Cleveland Stewart, Actor/Dancer
 Leon White, professional wrestler known as Big Van Vader
 "Big" Wendy Diaz, TV Personality, World record holder, Rubik's Cube Artist

References

External links

Los Angeles Unified School District schools
Bell, California
High schools in Los Angeles County, California
Public high schools in California
Maywood, California
1925 establishments in California
Educational institutions established in 1925